Ágoston or Agoston is a surname and given name. Notable people with the name include:

Given name
Ágoston Pável (1886–1946), Hungarian Slovene writer, poet, ethnologist, linguist and historian
Agoston Haraszthy (1812–1869), Hungarian-American traveler, writer, town-builder, and pioneer winemaker in Wisconsin and California

Surname
András Ágoston, ethnic Hungarian politician in Serbia and leader of Democratic Party of Vojvodina Hungarians
Emil Agoston (born 1876), Hungarian architect
Péter Ágoston (1874–1925), Hungarian politician, served as Minister of Foreign Affairs in 1919